Anne Mensah is a British broadcasting executive, and vice-president of content at Netflix.

Mensah was educated at Sedgehill School in Catford, south London, followed by the University of Exeter, where she earned a degree in American and Commonwealth arts.

In October 2021, she was ranked third in the Powerlist 2022 rankings of the most influential black people in the UK.

Mensah was Head of Independent Drama at the BBC as well as Head of Drama for BBC Scotland, and then Director of Drama and Sky Studios at Sky UK.

She is a governor and chair of the diversity & inclusion committee of the Royal Central School of Speech and Drama

References

Living people
British television people
Netflix people
British women business executives
Black British businesspeople
Alumni of the University of Exeter
Year of birth missing (living people)